The Conduct Committee is a select committee of the House of Lords in the Parliament of the United Kingdom. It has a remit oversee the Codes of Conduct and coordinate with the House of Lords Commissioner for Standards. The committee was established in May 2019 when the Committee for Privileges and Conduct was split into the Conduct Committee and the Procedure and Privileges Committee.

Membership
As of January 2023, the peer membership of the committee is:

The committee also includes lay members from outside the Lords.

See also
List of Committees of the United Kingdom Parliament

References

Committees of the House of Lords